The Perishers Live is a live album by The Perishers, released in 2005.

Track listing
"All Wrong" – 3:24
"Weekends" – 4:43
"Going Out" – 3:29
"Still Here" – 3:21
"Nothing Like You and I" – 3:29
"Sway" – 4:11
"Pills" (featuring Sarah McLachlan) – 3:56
"Trouble Sleeping" – 4:45
"My Heart" (Acoustic version, iTunes only) – 2:47
"Sway" (Acoustic version, iTunes only) – 3:29

References

The Perishers (band) albums
2005 live albums